Srigala Item (Indonesian for Black Wolf, also advertised with the Dutch title De Zwarte Wolf) is a 1941 film from the Dutch East Indies that was directed by Tan Tjoei Hock and produced by The Teng Chun for Action Film. Starring Hadidjah, Mohamad Mochtar, and Tan Tjeng Bok, the film's plot – inspired by Zorro – follows a young man who became a masked vigilante to take revenge against his conniving uncle. Srigala Item was a commercial success, which Misbach Yusa Biran credits to the plot's use for escapism. A copy of the black-and-white film, which featured kroncong music, is stored at Sinematek Indonesia.

Plot
Through violence, Djoekri (Tan Tjeng Bok) is able to gain control of his brother Mardjoeki's (Bissoe) wealth and plantation, Soemberwaras. The latter disappears, leaving behind his adult son Mochtar (Mohamad Mochtar). At the plantation, the young man is treated as a servant and often beaten by Djoekri and his right-hand man, Hasan. Djoekri's son Joesoef (Mohamad Sani), however, leads a life of plenty.

Soon Djoekri's activities are targeted by a masked man known as the "Black Wolf" ("Srigala Item"), who also foils Joesoef's attempts to woo Soehaemi (Hadidjah), whom Mochtar loves. Djoekri tires of the Black Wolf's interference and takes him on in a battle. Though Djoekri almost wins, ultimately the Black Wolf emerges victorious. It is later revealed that Mardjoeki remains alive and Mochtar was the Black Wolf.

Production
The film was written and directed by Tan Tjoei Hock for Action Film, a subsidiary of producer The Teng Chun's Java Industrial Film (JIF). Tan, who had made his directorial debut in 1940, based Srigala Item on the stories surrounding Johnston McCulley's fictional bandit Zorro; as with the American bandit, the Black Wolf used a whip and wore all black. The black-and-white film was shot by The Teng Chun's brother Teng Gan, with Hajopan Bajo Angin as artistic designer.

The film starred Hadidjah and Mohamad Mochtar, who had first acted together in JIF's Alang-Alang (Grass; 1939) and were promoted as a celebrity couple in competition with Raden Mochtar and Roekiah of Tan's Film. It also featured Bissoe, Tan Tjeng Bok, and Mohamad Sani. Bissoe had made his feature film debut with JIF's Oh Iboe in 1938, while Sani had made his debut for JIF in 1940. Tan Tjeng Bok, a former stage star with Dardanella, made his feature film debut through Srigala Item.

Music for Srigala Item was done in the kroncong (traditional music with Portuguese influences) style, popular at the time, by Mas Sardi. Hadidjah is credited as singing two songs, "Ja. Ja. Ja. Ja." ("Yeah. Yeah. Yeah. Yeah.") and "Termenoeng-Menoeng" ("Pensive"); Tan Tjeng Bok is also recorded as performing a song.

Release and reception

Srigala Item premiered in the first half of 1941, one of nine films released by JIF and its subsidiaries that year. It was advertised, sometimes under the Dutch name of De Zwarte Wolf, as "sensational, full of action, and mysterious" and marketed for all ages. The film was released in Batavia (modern day Jakarta), the capital of the Indies, and by July 1941 it had reached Surabaya, in Eastern Java, and Singapore, then part of British Malaya.

An anonymous review of Srigala Item in the Surabaya-based daily Soerabaijasch Handelsblad was positive, predicting the film would be a commercial success. This prediction was fulfilled, as Srigala Item reached extensive audiences – mostly lower-class natives. The Indonesian film historian Misbach Yusa Biran credits this success to escapism. He writes that the film's theme of an oppressed, financially destitute youth who is able to control his destiny by becoming a masked vigilante, allowed viewers to be able to see themselves as the Black Wolf, and thus take revenge against those who had wronged them.

Action Film and JIF continued producing films until the beginning of the Japanese occupation of the Indies began in early 1942, leading to the closing of all but one film studio. The cast of Srigala Item remained with JIF until the company closed, as did Tan. According to JB Kristanto's Katalog Film Indonesia (Catalogue of Indonesian Films), a copy of Srigala Item is stored at Sinematek Indonesia in Jakarta. The reels have been damaged by acid, leading to part of the film being excised.

Explanatory notes

References

Works cited

 
 

 
 

 

 
 
 

Dutch East Indies films
Films directed by Tan Tjoei Hock
Indonesian black-and-white films
Films based on works by Johnston McCulley